The Throne of Caesar is a historical mystery novel by American author Steven Saylor, first published by Minotaur Books in 2018. It is the thirteenth book in his Roma Sub Rosa series of mystery stories set in the final decades of the Roman Republic. The main character is the Roman sleuth Gordianus the Finder.  

The book begins March 10 and ends March 23, 44 B.C. It describes the assassination of Julius Caesar on March 15, the Ides of March.

External links 

 A review of The Throne of Caesar, published in The Austin Chronicle.
 A review of The Throne of Caesar, published in The Times.

Roma Sub Rosa
2008 American novels
Fictional depictions of Julius Caesar in literature
Fictional depictions of Cleopatra in literature
44 BC
Minotaur Books books